Julius Rockwell (April 26, 1805May 19, 1888) was a United States politician from Massachusetts, and the father of Francis Williams Rockwell.

Rockwell was born in Colebrook, Connecticut and educated at private schools and then Yale, where he studied law, graduating in 1826. He was admitted to the bar and in 1830 commenced practice in Pittsfield, Massachusetts. He was elected a member of the Massachusetts House of Representatives in 1834 and served four years, three of them as Speaker. Rockwell was appointed commissioner of the Bank of Massachusetts from 1838 to 1840.

In 1842 he successfully ran as a Whig candidate for the House of Representatives and was re-elected three times, serving from 1843 to 1851. He did not seek renomination in 1850. He was a delegate to the state constitutional convention in 1853, and was appointed to the Senate in 1854 to fill the vacancy caused by the resignation of Edward Everett, serving from June 3, 1854 to January 31, 1855, when his successor Henry Wilson was elected. Rockwell voted in the electoral college for the Republican candidate John C. Frémont in the presidential election of 1856.

Rockwell returned to his old post of Speaker of the Massachusetts House of Representatives in 1858, until his appointment to the Massachusetts Superior Court in 1859. He retired as a judge in 1886 and died May 19, 1888 in Lenox, Massachusetts, where he is buried.

See also
 56th Massachusetts General Court (1835)
 79th Massachusetts General Court (1858)

References

External links

Speakers of the Massachusetts House of Representatives
United States senators from Massachusetts
Yale University alumni
1805 births
1888 deaths
Politicians from Pittsfield, Massachusetts
Whig Party United States senators
Massachusetts state senators
Republican Party members of the Massachusetts House of Representatives
Whig Party members of the United States House of Representatives from Massachusetts
Burials in Massachusetts
1856 United States presidential electors
Massachusetts Superior Court justices
19th-century American politicians
19th-century American judges